Alejandro Rafael Acosta Cabrera (born 2 October 1990) is a Uruguayan footballer currently playing for FK Jablonec in the Czech First League.

Career
Acosta started his professional career playing for Deportivo Maldonado in October 2012. He made his debut on 13 October on a 0-0 home draw against Huracán F.C. on the first round of the 2012–13 season. On the third round he scored his first two goals against local derby Atenas De San Carlos winning the match 3-0 and being proclaimed man of the match.

In July 2013, he went to Argentina to be tested by Club Atlético Belgrano, but finally he did not stay at the club and returned to his country.

In early September 2013, Acosta signed a new contract with Atenas De San Carlos.

In July 2015, Acosta finally departed to Europe to play for Czech side Bohemians 1905 for 1-year loan.

On 23 June 2016, Acosta signed for Liga MX side Veracruz.

References

External links
 
 
 

1990 births
Living people
People from Maldonado, Uruguay
Uruguayan footballers
Uruguayan expatriate footballers
Association football midfielders
Deportivo Maldonado players
Atenas de San Carlos players
Bohemians 1905 players
FC Zbrojovka Brno players
FK Jablonec players
C.D. Veracruz footballers
Uruguayan Primera División players
Liga MX players
Expatriate footballers in the Czech Republic
Expatriate footballers in Mexico
Association football defenders
Czech First League players